Bishworjit Singh Konthoujam (born 3 February 1996) is an Indian cricketer. He made his List A debut for Manipur in the 2018–19 Vijay Hazare Trophy on 19 September 2018. He was the leading wicket-taker for Manipur in the 2018–19 Vijay Hazare Trophy, with nine dismissals in seven matches.

He made his first-class debut for Manipur in the 2018–19 Ranji Trophy on 1 November 2018. He was the leading wicket-taker for Manipur in the tournament, with 30 dismissals in eight matches. He made his Twenty20 debut for Manipur in the 2018–19 Syed Mushtaq Ali Trophy on 21 February 2019.

References

External links
 

1996 births
Living people
Indian cricketers
Manipur cricketers
Place of birth missing (living people)